Gudia was a 1947 Indian drama film, starring Eddie Billimoria, Balraj Sahni, and Damayanti Sahni.

External links

1947 films
1940s Hindi-language films
Indian black-and-white films